János Balogh (born 29 November 1982 in Debrecen) is a Hungarian football goalkeeper who is currently playing for Csenger FC.

Club career

Early career
Balogh began his career with hometown club Debreceni VSC, picking up a Magyar Kupa winner's medal in 2001. In 2004, he joined FC Sopron for a season where he won the Hungarian cup for a second time, before spending a brief spell with Nyíregyháza Spartacus and then returning to Debreceni VSC. The following seasons proved to be very successful domestically as Balogh won the Hungarian League and the Szuperkupa in 2007 and the Hungarian cup for a third time in 2008. In August 2008 he left to join Heart of Midlothian.

Hearts
Balogh signed for Hearts on an initial six-month loan in August 2008, where he was expected to compete with Marian Kello and Jamie MacDonald for a place in the starting line-up. On 19 October 2008 he made his debut as a half time replacement for the injured Marian Kello in an Edinburgh derby at Easter Road. The match ended 1–1 with Balogh making a crucial save to deny Derek Riordan a winning goal in the dying minutes. He signed for the Jambos on a permanent deal on 2 February 2009 from Debreceni VSC for a fee of £185,000. After spending the early part of his career battling Kello for a place in the first-team he eventually lost out to the Slovakian and spent much of his time on the bench and with the emergence of Jamie MacDonald he slipped to third-choice, making only one appearance in the 2011–12 season. As his contract with the club was set to expire in January 2012 he was widely expected to depart Tynecastle in the new year, however on 7 December 2011 he left the club early by agreeing to terminate his contract. He left having made 41 appearances in all competitions for Hearts and described his performances in Edinburgh derbies as personal highlights.

International career 
Balogh made his debut for the Hungary national team on 12 September 2007, in Istanbul against Turkey.

(Statistics correct as of 20 July 2009)

International matches

Honours
Debreceni VSC
Hungarian League: 2007
Magyar Kupa: 2001, 2008
Runners-up: 2003, 2007
Szuperkupa: 2007
Runner-up: 2008
Hungarian Liga Cup: Runner-up 2008FC Sopron
Magyar Kupa: 2005

References

External links 

Profile at londonhearts.com
Futball-adattár 

1982 births
Living people
Sportspeople from Debrecen
Hungarian footballers
Hungary under-21 international footballers
Hungary international footballers
Association football goalkeepers
Debreceni VSC players
FC Sopron players
Nyíregyháza Spartacus FC players
Heart of Midlothian F.C. players
Nemzeti Bajnokság I players
Scottish Premier League players
Hungarian expatriate footballers
Expatriate footballers in Scotland
Hungarian expatriate sportspeople in Scotland